Charles Leipart is an American musical theatre bookwriter-lyricist and playwright.  He was born in Chicago and graduated from Northwestern University. He lives in New York City.

Works (selection) 
MUSICALS
Book & Lyrics for all works:
 Good Girls Only, the Rehearsal Club Musical, music by Jamey Grisham; additional music by John Kroner and Eric Scott Reed
 Dickens' Haunted Christmas, the new mystery musical, music by Eric Schorr
 Me and Miss Monroe, an original musical, music by William Goldstein
 Enchanted April, a new musical romance adapted from Elizabeth von Arnim's novel The Enchanted April, music by Richard B. Evans
 Frog Kiss,  a musical adapted from The Frog Prince by Stephen Mitchell, music by Eric Schorr
 The Showgirl of 52nd Street, an original musical, music by John Kroner
 The Price of Everything, an original musical adapted from Thorstein Veblen's The Theory of The Leisure Class, music by Richard B. Evans
 espresso trasho, an original musical, music by Eric Schorr
 The Doctor's Wife, a musical adapted from Gustave Flaubert's Madame Bovary, music by Eric Schorr

PLAYS
George and Martha's Wedding Gift, a Play of Enslavement
Tailoring Hitler, Made-to-Measure in One Act
The Adolf I Knew, a Play of Collective Memory
 A Kind of Marriage, a play about the private life of British novelist E. M. Forster
 Swimming at the Ritz, a stage play about Pamela Churchill Harriman
 Underfoot in Show Business, a stage play adapted from the comic memoir by Helene Hanff.
 Mr. & Mrs. "A", a stage play
 Deep Sleepers, a comedy, published by Dramatists' Play Service
 The Undefeated Rhumba Champ, a one-act comedy, published by Dramatists Play Service

 Awards 

 LGBT History Playwriting Initiative Award 2015, Arch and Bruce Brown Foundation, A Kind of Marriage Honorable Mention
 Excellence in Writing: Lyrics, New York Musical Theatre Festival, 2010, Frog Kiss Most Promising Musical, New York Musical Theatre Festival, 2010, Frog Kiss Honorable Mention
 Excellence in Writing: Book, New York Musical Theatre Festival, 2010, Frog Kiss Honorable Mention
 Finalist, The Fred Ebb Award, 2005, 2006 & 2008
 Global Search for New Musicals, Cardiff, Wales, 2005, Frog Kiss Edward Kleban Foundation Award—Outstanding Librettist, 2001, The Showgirl of 52nd Street''

References

External links 
 www.charlesleipart.com
 http://offbroadway.broadwayworld.com/article/Rachel_York_Leads_AMAS_ME_AND_MISS_MONROE_42123_20110321
 https://web.archive.org/web/20110726141533/http://www.amasmusical.org/recentevents.html
 https://web.archive.org/web/20100908064703/http://www.frogkissthemusical.com/FROG_KISS_THE_MUSICAL/The_Lilly_Pad.html
 https://web.archive.org/web/20101220213327/http://www.playbill.com/news/article/144966-PHOTO-CALL-Bebe-Neuwirth-Chita-Rivera-Joshua-Henry-and-More-at-the-NYMF-Awards
 http://www.theatermania.com/new-york/reviews/10-2010/nymf-2010-roundup-2_31017.html
 http://www.theargus.co.uk/leisure/theatre/argustheatrereviews/8915539.Swimming_At_The_Ritz__Devonshire_Park_Theatre__Eastbourne__March_15/
 http://www.eastbourneherald.co.uk/news/review_swimming_at_the_ritz_1_1434158
 https://web.archive.org/web/20121022032626/http://www.playbill.com/news/article/58925-Leipart-Bucchino-and-Cook-Win-2001-Kleban-Award

American dramatists and playwrights
Year of birth missing (living people)
Living people
Northwestern University alumni